Joachim Fretz (1926–1994) was a German radio personality who spent the majority of his life in East Berlin. He was a popular host on the Berliner Rundfunk and when he left the program in 1967, he quickly faded into obscurity. He died of a heart attack at the age of 68 in Zwickau.

He joined the SED in 1949 and was an outspoken socialist. He published several books, including In der Neue Deutschland (1955), a study of the changes that Germany had undergone since the collapse of the Nazi regime.

1926 births
1994 deaths
20th-century German non-fiction writers
German male non-fiction writers
German political writers
German radio personalities
German socialists